Martin Baran (born 3 January 1988) is a Slovak professional footballer who plays as a centre-back or defensive midfielder for Tatran Prešov.

Career 
Baran began his career with Tatran Prešov and played in 2008 eleven games on loan for LAFC Lučenec. On 29 June 2009, Baran has signed five-year contract for Kasımpaşa S.K.

References

External links
 
 

1988 births
Living people
Sportspeople from Prešov
Slovak footballers
Association football central defenders
Association football midfielders
1. FC Tatran Prešov players
Kasımpaşa S.K. footballers
Polonia Bytom players
Polonia Warsaw players
Jagiellonia Białystok players
Wigry Suwałki players
Podbeskidzie Bielsko-Biała players
Odra Opole players
FK Železiarne Podbrezová players
Znicz Pruszków players
Slovak Super Liga players
Süper Lig players
Ekstraklasa players
I liga players
II liga players
Slovak expatriate sportspeople in Turkey
Expatriate footballers in Turkey
Expatriate footballers in Poland